The Egyptian Museum of Berlin is home to one of the world's most important collections of ancient Egyptian artefacts, including the iconic Nefertiti Bust. Since 1855, the collection is a part of the Neues Museum on Berlin's Museum Island, which reopened after renovations in 2009.

History

The museum originated in the 18th century from the royal art collection of the Hohenzollern kings of Prussia. Alexander von Humboldt had recommended that an Egyptian section be created, and the first objects were brought to Berlin in 1828 under King Friedrich Wilhelm III. Initially housed in Monbijou Palace, the department was headed by the Trieste merchant Giuseppe Passalacqua (1797–1865), whose extensive collections formed the basis. A Prussian expedition to Egypt and Nubia led by Karl Richard Lepsius in 1842–45 brought additional pieces to Berlin.

In 1850, the collections moved to its present-day home in the Neues Museum, built according to plans designed by Friedrich August Stüler. The Nefertiti Bust, discovered during the excavations by Ludwig Borchardt in Amarna, was donated to the museum by the entrepreneur Henri James Simon in 1920; it quickly became its best-known exhibit. After World War II, during which the Neues Museum was heavily damaged by strategic bombing, the collections were divided between East and West Berlin. The main part remained in East Berlin and was displayed at the Bode Museum, while those artifacts evacuated to West Germany, including the Nefertiti Bust, returned to West Berlin. From 1967 to 2005, these items were housed vis-à-vis Charlottenburg Palace. The whole collection was reunited again after the Reunification of Germany, when it returned to Museum Island.

Collection
The collection contains artefacts dating from between 4000 BC (the Predynastic era) to the period of Roman rule, though most date from the rule of Akhenaten (around 1340BC).

The most famous piece on display is the exceptionally well preserved and vividly coloured bust of Queen Nefertiti. The collection was moved from Charlottenburg to the Altes Museum in 2005 and was rehoused within the newly reconstructed Neues Museum on Berlin's Museum Island in October 2009.

Gallery

See also 
 List of museums of Egyptian antiquities

References

External links 

 Staatliche Museen zu Berlin: Egyptian Museum and Papyrus Collection
 Neues Museum Berlin
 Society for the Promotion of the Egyptian Museum Berlin (archived)
 Flickr – Photos taken in the Egyptian Museum

Egyptological collections in Germany
Archaeological museums in Germany
Museum Island
Museums established in 1828
Berlin State Museums
Museums in Berlin